David Miranda (born 10 December 1942) is a Salvadoran former cyclist. He competed in the individual road race at the 1968 Summer Olympics.

References

External links
 

1942 births
Living people
Salvadoran male cyclists
Olympic cyclists of El Salvador
Cyclists at the 1968 Summer Olympics
Sportspeople from Santa Ana, El Salvador